The Danube Cossack Host was a Ukrainian Cossack Host formed in 1828 prior to the Russo-Turkish War (1828–1829), on the order of Emperor Nicholas I from descendants of the Zaporozhian Cossacks living in Bessarabia and in particularly the Budjak. Ukrainian Cossack Host named Lower-Danube Budjak Host had been formed there in 1807 but was disbanded soon afterwards. The Host also included some volunteers from the Nekrasov Cossacks and the Balkan peoples such as Romanians, Serbs and Bulgarians. Initially three selos of the Akkerman poviat were in the Cossacks control: Akmangit, Starokazachye, and Volonterovka.

Overview 

After the War, the Host was tasked with guarding the borders of the Bessarabian and Kherson Governorates, and it had outposts in Odessa, Izmail and Akkerman, which also housed the central headquarters. Initially as Wallachia was administered by Russia, the Tsar expected all of the Nekrasov Cossacks that remained in the Danube Delta to join this Host as well, however most refused further military service. Instead in 1839, concerned with extent of Gypsy activities, Russia suggested to enlist them as Cossacks. Although most Gypsies chose to decline the offer, those that did would make nearly quarter of the Cossacks in the Host

During the Crimean War, the Danube Cossacks became famous for their Rocket artillery in the capturing of Tulcea, Isaccea and Măcin, which supported the main armies in covering their bridgeheads and preventing the Turkish Army from breaking to the Danube. Both Danube Cossack regiments were awarded the Georgian Banners. After the 1856 Treaty of Paris, Russia ceded some of the Budjak territory and the Host moved to stanitsa Nikolayevka-Novorossiyskaya (modern selo within Odessa Oblast, Ukraine), consequently, losing the Danube river, the Host was renamed to Novorossiyan Cossack Host in 1856.

By 1858 the new Host had 10 stanitsas and numbered twelve thousand men. However in the next decade, a time of relative peace, most lost their combat ability and were involved in internal customs and police service, and in 1868 in wake of the administrative reform of Emperor Alexander II, the Host was disbanded, and most of the Cossacks continued service in customs and police, but now under civil administration. With that, ended the nearly of Cossack presence in the Budjak territory. Today, there are efforts to re-create the Cossack lifestyle centered in that province by local enthusiasts.

References

External links 
 Uniforms of the Danube Host 

Bessarabia
Zaporozhian Host
Cossack hosts